The mixed 4 × 100 metre medley relay event at the 2015 European Games in Baku took place on 26 June at the Aquatic Palace.

Results

Heats
The heats were started at 11:18.

Final
The final was held at 19:46.

References

Mixed 4 x 100 metre medley relay